Rawls is an unincorporated community located in the Hector's Creek Township of Harnett County, North Carolina, United States.

References

Unincorporated communities in Harnett County, North Carolina
Unincorporated communities in North Carolina